Ance  may refer to:

 Ance (given name), a feminine given name
 Ance, Latvia
 Ance, Pyrénées-Atlantiques, Nouvelle-Aquitaine, France
 Associazione Nazionale Costruttori Edili (ANCE), the Italian Association of private construction contractors